Dublin Nightmare is a 1958 British thriller film directed by John Pomeroy and starring William Sylvester, Marla Landi and Richard Leech. The film is a low budget quota quickie shot at Twickenham Studios.

Plot
Irish nationalists plan to seize a security van to raise money for their movement. A photographer begins to investigate the raid, as one of his friends was murdered during it.

Cast
 William Sylvester ... John Kevin
 Marla Landi ...  Anna Monti
 Richard Leech ...  Steve Lawlor
 Harry Hutchinson ...  Finian
 William Sherwood ...  Edward Dillon
 Jack Cunningham ...  O'Connor
 Gerald Lawson ...  Tramp
 Helen Lindsay ...  Mary O'Callaghan
 Pat O'Sullivan ...  Danny O'Callaghan
 John McCarthy ...  Morgan

Critical reception
TV Guide called it "a routine crime drama"; while Britmovie described it as a "compact b-movie based on the novel by Robin Estridge and effectively directed by John Pomeroy that transposes a Third Man style plot to 1950s Ireland."

References

External links

1958 films
British thriller drama films
1950s thriller films
1950s English-language films
1950s British films